Novy Mir (New World) was a magazine published by Russian social democratic émigrés in New York City in 1911–1917 until their return to Russia after the February Revolution of 1917. It was edited by Nikolai Bukharin and Alexandra Kollontai, who were briefly joined by Leon Trotsky when he arrived in New York in January 1917. V. Volodarsky, then living in Philadelphia, was one of the contributors.  Alexander Gumberg was business manager in Novy Mir's final days.

References

Communist magazines
Defunct political magazines published in the United States
Magazines disestablished in 1917
Magazines published in New York City
Marxist magazines
Publications of the Communist Party of the Soviet Union
Russian-language magazines
Russian-American culture in New York City
Russian-language mass media in the United States